There are about 500 New Caledonians of Indian descent. They were known as Malabars and orinignally arrived in the 19th century from other French Territories, namely Réunion.

New Caledonia has several descendants of Tamils, whose parents intermarried with the local population already in the last century. New Caledonia requires a special study since many Tamils went there as labourers and a report in a book published about 1919 states that of the Chinese, Indians and Javanese who colonised new Caledonia, the Indians gave satisfaction. In Tahiti in August 1967, about twenty families who had descended from Tamils were found. Neither the parents nor the children had any knowledge of their ancestry, but the parents remembered their own parents and how when their parents and Indian friends met they spoke 'la langue' and often sang and cried remembering their homeland. The family name was the only clue to their Indian origin e.g. Pavalacoddy, Mariasoosay, Rayappan, Saminathan, Thivy and Veerasamy.

References
Tamil Diaspora of New Caledonia

New Caledonia
Indian diaspora in Oceania